Antonio Rubino (15 May 1880 – 1 July 1964) was an Italian illustrator, cartoonist, animation director, screenwriter, playwright, author and poet. He was the most prolific comics illustrator in Italy before World War I.

Biography

Born Antonio Augusto Rubino in Sanremo, Rubino graduated in law. Then, as an autodidact, he turned his focus to drawing, debuting as the illustrator of Alberto Colantuoni's book L'Albatros.

After collaborating with several newspapers and magazines, in 1908 he started a collaboration as illustrator and cartoonist with the children's magazine Corriere dei Piccoli, for which he created numerous successful comic characters, notably Quadratino and Italino. In the 1920s and 1930s Rubino was also chief-editor and sometimes founder of several children's publications, such as Il Balilla, Topolino, Mondo Bambino, and Mondo Fanciullo.

He also directed several animated films, debuting in 1942 with Paese dei Ranocchi (The Land of the Frogs), which won the best film award at the Venice Film Festival in the animation category. His film  I sette colori (The Seven Colors, released posthumously in 1955), has been described as one of "the most innovative and eclectic films" in the Italian animation field.

The surreal style of Rubino has been variously associated to Futurism, East Asian painting, and above all Art Nouveau.

References

Further reading
 Giuseppe Bevione. "Un artista fantastico", in La Lettura. 1 April 1905.
 Rino Albertarelli. "Storia del fumetto: Antonio Rubino", in Linus. n. 1, April 1965.
 Giuseppe Trevisani. Antonio Rubino. Quadratino e i suoi amici. Garzanti, 1967.
 Paola Pallottino. La matita di zucchero. Antonio Rubino. Cappelli, 1978
 Daniele Riva (ed.). Antonio Rubino - Estasi, incubi e allucinazioni 1900-1920. Gabriele Mazzotta Editore, 1980.
 Maria Claudia Capovilla. "Antonio Rubino: formazione di uno stile grafico originale", in Arte in Friuli, 1985.
 Claudio Bertieri (ed.). Antonio Rubino - L'amico delle nuvole. Comune di Sanremo, 1995.   
 Vitaliano Rocchiero. Antonio Rubino (1980-1964), in Liguria, n. 10-11, October 1998.
 Claudio Bertieri (ed.). Mondo Fanciullo - Antonio Rubino narratore per ragazzi. Comune di Sanremo, 2005.
 Linda Pacifici. "Far fantasticare fantasticando: gli esordi artistici di Antonio Rubino e Giuseppe Fanciulli", in Artista, Critica dell'arte in Toscana, 2005.
 Matteo Stefanelli, Fabio Gadducci (ed.). Antonio Rubino - Gli anni del Corriere dei Piccoli. Black Velvet Editrice, 2009.
 Matteo Fochessati. "La cameretta dei bambini di Antonio Rubino alla Wolfsoniana", in LG Argomenti, XLVI, n. 2, April 2010. pp. 10–13.
 Freddy Colt. "Antonio Rubino, poeta "fantasy" e illustratore", in Sanremesità, Volti e risvolti della cultura locale. Philobiblon, 2013. pp. 26–29.

External links
 
 

Italian comics artists
1880 births
1964 deaths
People from Sanremo
Italian illustrators
Italian film directors
Art Nouveau illustrators
Italian animators
Italian animated film directors
Italian surrealist artists
Italian dramatists and playwrights